Terazidere is a rapid transit station on the M1 line of the Istanbul Metro located in southern Esenler. It was opened on 31 January 1994 as part of the Otogar-Zeytinburnu extension and is one of the five stations of this extension.

Layout

References

Istanbul metro stations
Railway stations opened in 1994
Bayrampaşa